The 2012–13 BVIFA National Football League is the fourth season of the highest competitive football league in the British Virgin Islands, after it was founded in 2009. The season commenced on 18 November 2012. Islanders FC are the defending champions, having won the previous three championships.

Team information
For the 2012–13 season the league decided to split the teams into two groups, based on the position they finished in the standings at the end of the 2011–12 season. At the end of the season the league is to be split into two leagues, the Premier League and the National League.

Group A
East End Eagles
Islanders FC
Lucian Stars
Old Madrid
Sugar Boys
VG Ballstars

Group B
Haitian Stars
One Love United
Panthers FC
Rebels FC
VG United
Wolues FC

League table

Group A

Group B

Results

Group A

Group B

References

BVIFA National Football League seasons
British
football
football